Lost River General Store, also known as Lost River Store House, is an historic general store located on the grounds of The Inn at Lost River at Lost River, Hardy County, West Virginia. It was built in 1898, and is a two-story, front gable, wood-frame building with a one-story front porch. The front section measures approximately 20 feet by 40 feet. The store building was renovated in the 1990s.  From the early 1900s (decade) until 1979, the building also housed the Lost River Post Office. Also on the property is an outhouse that may have been built in the 1930s by a Works Progress Administration (WPA) crew.

It was listed on the National Register of Historic Places in 2005.

Temporarily closed in 2020, the store and the inn reopened in 2021 under new ownership.

References

External links
Lost River General Store website

Commercial buildings completed in 1898
Buildings and structures in Hardy County, West Virginia
Commercial buildings on the National Register of Historic Places in West Virginia
Buildings designated early commercial in the National Register of Historic Places in West Virginia
National Register of Historic Places in Hardy County, West Virginia
Post office buildings on the National Register of Historic Places in West Virginia
Works Progress Administration in West Virginia
1898 establishments in West Virginia
General stores in the United States